Coridius janus, sometimes known as the red pumpkin bug, is a species of bug in the family Dinidoridae. It feeds by sucking on the sap on soft parts of plants especially in the cucurbit family and causes damage to crops.

The species was originally described in the genus Cimex by Fabricius and later placed in the genus Aspongopus. The antenna is five segmented with the third segment longer than the first which is shorter than all other segments, the body outline is oval. The scutellum is short and has a rounded apex. The proboscis tip extends past the coxae of the first pair of legs. They are yellowish to orange red in colour with a black stripe on the anterior pronotal edge sometimes broke in the middle. The basal half of the scutellum and the membrane of the forewing is also black. The species is widely distributed in tropical South and Southeast Asia but has spread to other parts of the world.

Coridius janus has been used in numerous physiological and anatomic studies that have demonstrated their strong cibarial muscles used for sucking sap. Like other bugs they produce defensive chemicals from metathoracic scent glands opening ventrally at the base of the third coxae. These chemicals are known to repel ants (Anoplolepis longipes) and beetles and the effectiveness of a mixture of the key compounds trans-2-hexenal; n-tridecane (60:40 by weight) was greater than with comparative alkanes of shorter or longer lengths.

References

Dinidoridae